The following is a list of Baylor Bears men's basketball head coaches. The Bears have had 17 coaches in their 116-season history.

Baylor's current head coach is Scott Drew. He was hired in August 2003 to replace Dave Bliss, who resigned amidst the investigation into the Baylor University basketball scandal.

References

Baylor

Baylor Bears men's basketball coaches